QSI International School of Sarajevo is an international school in Sarajevo, Bosnia and Herzegovina.

The language of instruction is English. The curriculum is based on US National Standards with the addition of three foreign languages. The school is funded by tuition fees. Students range from 3 to 18 years of age. The school's Director is Scott Legan. The school was located in Vogošća, a quiet suburb of Sarajevo. It has approximately 150 students, representing 37 nationalities. It recently changed location to a building closer to the city center.

Sarajevo International School is part of Quality Schools International and is accredited by the Middle States Association of Colleges and Schools.

References

External links 
 Official Site

Schools in Bosnia and Herzegovina
Quality Schools International
Grad Sarajevo
International high schools